Maria Dorothea Wagner (1719 - 1792) was a German painter and drafter. She was primarily a landscape artist, focusing on the landscape of Saxony.

Life and work

Maria Dorothea Wagner was born in 1719 in Weimar. Her father was a court painter for the duchess Sophie Charlotte of Brandenburg-Bayreuth. Her brother was Christian Wilhelm Ernst Dietrich.

She died in 1792 in Meissen.

Notable collections
Landscape with a waterfall over which a footbridge leads, on the left a farmer drives two cows down to the valley, in the background a ruin, 18th century, Städel Museum
Rising sunken path on a river, 18th century, Städel Museum

Gallery

References

1719 births
1792 deaths
18th-century German painters
Artists from Weimar
German Baroque painters
German landscape painters
German women painters
People from Meissen